"You Should Be My Girl" is a song performed by Sammie, who is signed to Dallas Austin's Rowdy Records. It was first single to be released from his self-titled second album. The song features Sean Paul of The YoungBloodZ. It was produced by Jazze Pha and released in June 2006.

It managed to chart BET's 106 & Park and reached number 2. The video featured Sean P, Lloyd Polite, Teairra Mari, Da BackWudz, Big Boi of Outkast, Jazze Pha and Dallas Austin.

Charts

2006 singles
Sammie songs
Songs written by Sean Paul
2006 songs
Cash Money Records singles